Javier Tamayo (born 16 March 1950) is a Colombian footballer. He competed in the men's tournament at the 1968 Summer Olympics.

References

External links

1950 births
Living people
Colombian footballers
Colombia international footballers
Olympic footballers of Colombia
Footballers at the 1968 Summer Olympics
Sportspeople from Medellín
Association football forwards
Independiente Medellín footballers
América de Cali footballers
Atlético Nacional footballers
Millonarios F.C. players
Unión Magdalena footballers
Deportes Quindío footballers